The 2020 Spa-Francorchamps FIA Formula 3 round was a motor racing event held on 29 and 30 August 2020 at the Circuit de Spa-Francorchamps in Stavelot, Belgium. It was the seventh round of the 2020 FIA Formula 3 Championship, and ran in support of the 2020 Belgian Grand Prix.

Entries 
Max Fewtrell left Hitech Grand Prix after the Barcelona round. He was replaced by Frenchman and series rookie Pierre-Louis Chovet. At Carlin Buzz Racing, David Schumacher was hired as a full-time driver, leaving Charouz Racing System to replace the German with Michael Belov. Finally, Sophia Flörsch could not attend the Spa round due to her commitments in the European Le Mans Series, and was replaced by Euroformula Open driver Andreas Estner at Campos.

Classification

Qualifying 
The Qualifying session took place on 28 August 2020, with Lirim Zendeli scoring pole position.

Feature Race

Sprint Race 

 Notes：

  - Dennis Hauger originally finished 18th, but was given a five-second time penalty for causing a collision with Calan Williams.
  - Michael Belov was given a five-second time penalty for causing a collision with Federico Malvestiti.
  - Federico Malvestiti was given a ten-second time penalty for causing a collision with Cameron Das.

Standings after the event 

Drivers' Championship standings

Teams' Championship standings

 Note: Only the top five positions are included for both sets of standings.

See also 

 2020 Belgian Grand Prix
 2020 Spa-Francorchamps Formula 2 round

References

External links 
Official website

|- style="text-align:center"
|width="35%"|Previous race:
|width="30%"|FIA Formula 3 Championship2020 season
|width="40%"|Next race:

Spa-Francorchamps
2020 in Belgian motorsport